Mart High School is a public high school located in Mart, Texas (USA) and classified as a 2A school by the UIL. It is part of the Mart Independent School District located in eastern McLennan County. In 2015, the school was rated "Met Standard" by the Texas Education Agency.

History
Mart High School was established in 1906 and graduated its first senior class in 1908 and used its main building until 2017. They are building a new high school that will be done in 2019.  Integration between Mart and all-black Anderson High school began in 1966 and was fully integrated by 1970 after Anderson High School graduated its last class in 1969.

Mart High School is known statewide for its success on the football field, compiling over 700 wins, ranking them in the top 5 in the state and in the top 20 nationally.

Athletics
The Mart Panthers compete in these sports - 

Baseball
Basketball
Football
Golf
Softball
Track and Field
Volleyball

State titles
Basketball - 
1976 (2A)
Football - 
1957 (1A), 1969 (1A), 1999 (2A/D1), 2006 (2A/D2), 2010 (1A/D1), 2017 (2A/D1), 2018 (2A/D2), 2019 (2A/D2)
Boys Golf - 
1981 (2A)
Boys Track - 
1970 (1A), 1978 (1A)

State finalists
Football - 
1986 (2A), 2000 (2A/D2), 2008 (1A/D1), 2012 (1A/D1) 2020 (2A/D2), 2022 (2A/D2)

References

External links
 

Schools in McLennan County, Texas
Public high schools in Texas